Matthew Daniels (born September 27, 1989) is a former American football safety and current special teams coach of the Minnesota Vikings of the National Football League (NFL). 

He was signed by the St. Louis Rams as an undrafted free agent in 2012. Daniels played college football for Duke.

College career
Daniels played college football for the Duke University Blue Devils. In 2008, as a true freshman, he played in 10 games with one start and finished the year with 22 tackles, one INT and one fumble recovery. In 2009 the Sophomore safety was an Academic All-ACC selection and started all 12 games and finished third on the team and 18th in the ACC with 83 tackles and added 3.0 tackles for loss, 0.5 quarterback sacks, six pass breakups and three caused fumbles. In 2010, his junior season, Daniels was again an Academic All-ACC choice and started all 12 games and finished second on the team with 93 total tackles and added 6.0 tackles for loss, seven PBUs, three caused fumbles, two fumble recoveries and one INT. In his Senior Year, 2011, Daniels was a Second-team All-American and finished with 126 tackles. He graduated Duke as the school's all-time leader in several key defensive categories such as tackles, caused fumbles, and pass breakups.

Professional career

St. Louis Rams
In 2012, he was signed by the Rams as an undrafted free agent. He was released on August 26, 2014. He was signed to the Rams practice squad on September 1, 2014. He was released on September 3, 2014 to make room for Brad Smelley.

Jacksonville Jaguars
Daniels was signed to the Jaguars practice squad on October 27, 2014. He was promoted to the active roster on December 17.  He was waived with an injury settlement on September 1, 2015.

San Diego Chargers
On November 4, 2015, the San Diego Chargers signed Daniels to the practice squad. On December 28, 2015, the San Diego Chargers promoted Daniels to the 53-man roster.

Coaching career
In 2017, Daniels was a defensive graduate assistant coach at Colorado. On February 26, 2018, the Los Angeles Rams announced that they had added Daniels to their coaching staff, hiring him as assistant special teams coach. Daniels played with the Rams under current special teams coordinator John Fassel in the recent past.

After the 2019 season, he served as assistant special teams coach for the Dallas Cowboys. After two seasons there, he joined the Minnesota Vikings as the special teams coach in 2022.

References

External links
 Duke profile

1989 births
Living people
American football safeties
Dallas Cowboys coaches
Duke Blue Devils football players
Jacksonville Jaguars players
Los Angeles Rams coaches
San Diego Chargers players
St. Louis Rams players
People from Fayetteville, Georgia
Players of American football from Tucson, Arizona
Sportspeople from the Atlanta metropolitan area
Coaches of American football from Georgia (U.S. state)
Players of American football from Georgia (U.S. state)
African-American coaches of American football
African-American players of American football
21st-century African-American sportspeople
20th-century African-American people
Minnesota Vikings coaches